Dereli is a village in the Pertek District, Tunceli Province, Turkey. The village is populated by Kurds and Turks and had a population of 107 in 2021.

The hamlets of Akyurt, Hacıcemal and Karakuş are attached to the village.

References 

Villages in Pertek District
Kurdish settlements in Tunceli Province